Ludwika Róża Ossolińska (1797–1850), was a Polish writer, poet and philanthropist. She was a popular writer in contemporary Poland and mainly wrote children's stories.

References

 Polski Słownik Biograficzny. T. 24. s. 386.

19th-century Polish women writers
1797 births
1850 deaths